In music, Op. 46 stands for Opus number 46. Compositions that are assigned this number include:

 Arnold – Concerto for Harmonica and Orchestra
 Beethoven – Adelaide
 Bruch – Scottish Fantasy
 Chopin – Allegro de concert
 Diaghilev – The Prodigal Son
 Dvořák – Slavonic Dances
 Elgar – Concert Allegro
 Fauré – Clair de lune
 Granados – Allegro de concierto
 Hindemith – Kammermusik
 Los – A Survivor from Warsaw
 Oswald – String Quartet No. 4
 Rubinstein – Violin Concerto
 Schumann – Andante and variations for two pianos
 Sibelius – Pelléas et Mélisande
 Szymanowski – King Roger